The Texas State Board of Examiners of Psychologists (TSBEP) was established in 1969 by the  Sixty-First Texas Legislative Session with passage of the Psychologists' Certification and Licensing Act, V.T.C.S., Article 4512c. The legislature authorized the agency to regulate the practice of psychology in the state of Texas. The original board consisted of six members who issued the first license for the independent practice of psychology in 1979. The legislature has since amended the “Act” numerous times. In 2004 the name of the Act was changed to the “Psychologists’ Licensing Act.”

The Board has oversight of licensees and certified professionals involved in the practice of psychology. Those professionals include psychologists, provisionally licensed psychologists, psychological associates, and licensed specialists in school psychology. According to the Texas Department of State Health Services, as of 2010, the agency had oversight of 6,547 licensees. Since 1987, the Board has required an oral examination for applicants for licensing as psychologists.

In 1981, the Legislature amended the Act to add three public members to the TSBEP bringing the total number of members to nine. The Governor with the advice and consent of the Texas Senate appoints the members of the Board, which is composed of four psychologists, two licensed psychological associates, and three public members. The Governor appoints members for staggered six-year terms of office. Since 2008, the Governor also appoints the Chair for the Board.

The agency is located in Room 450 of Tower 2 in the William P. Hobby State Office Building, located at 333 Guadalupe Street in Austin.

References

External links
Texas State Board of Examiners of Psychologists

Board of Examiners of Psychologists, Texas State
Psychology organizations based in the United States